Tumid lupus erythematosus  is a rare, but distinctive entity in which patients present with edematous erythematous plaques, usually on the trunk.

Lupus erythematosus tumidus (LET) was reported by Henri Gougerot and Burnier R. in 1930. It is a photosensitive skin disorder, a different subtype of cutaneous lupus erythematosus (CLE) from discoid lupus erythematosus (DLE) or subacute CLE (SCLE).  LET is usually found on sun-exposed areas of the body. Skin lesions are edematous, urticarialike annular papules and plaques.  Topical corticosteroids are not effective as treatment for LET, but many will respond to chloroquine. LET  resolves with normal skin, no residual scarring, no hyperpigmentation or hypopigmentation.  Cigarette smokers who have LET may not respond very well to chloroquine.

It has been suggested that it is equivalent to Jessner lymphocytic infiltrate of the skin.

See also 
 Lupus erythematosus
 List of cutaneous conditions

References 

Cutaneous lupus erythematosus